In golf, a caddie (or caddy) is the person who carries a player's bag and clubs, and gives the player advice and moral support.

Etymology
It later came to refer to someone who did odd jobs. By the 19th century, it had come to mean someone who carried clubs for a golfer, or in its shortened form, cad, a man of disreputable behaviour.

History

The first recorded use of a caddie was in Edinburgh in 1681 by the future James II of England when taking part in the first international golf contest.

Earnings
Caddies tend to be low paid, and usually get only a small share of prize money. At a professional level, they work as contractors to individual players but without guaranteed hours. In 2020, caddies on the PGA European Tour became eligible to earn bonuses through sponsors' logos on their gear.

In popular culture
Caddies have been depicted in television, films, and books, including:

 The Caddy, a 1953 musical comedy film starring Dean Martin and Jerry Lewis
 McAuslan in the Rough, a 1974 short story by George MacDonald Fraser in which a disreputable Scottish soldier caddies for his regimental sergeant major
 Caddyshack, a 1980 comedy film featuring Bill Murray
 Brown's Requiem, a 1981 crime novel by James Ellroy, who worked as a caddie while writing his first books
 The Legend of Bagger Vance, a 2000 film based on the 1995 book by Steven Pressfield, The Legend of Bagger Vance: A Novel of Golf and the Game of Life, features Vance as an angelic caddie.
 Loopers: The Caddie's Long Walk, a 2018 documentary narrated by Bill Murray

See also
 Caddie Hall of Fame

References

External links

 European Tour Caddies Association
 "Caddies making a comeback", The Seattle Times
 "Notes from the Caddieshack" - a McSweeney's Internet Tendency column about being a caddie in the Chicago suburbs

 
Golf people

sv:Lista över golftermer#Caddie